Silvio Brancaccio (29 July 1888 - 29 August 1971) was an Italian Lieutenant General who was attached to and helped command the XVII Corps during the Italian occupation of Montenegro.

Biography 
After graduating from the Royal Army Officer's Academy of Naples, Brancaccio had originally seen minor combat experience during the Italo-Turkish War, briefly serving as a staff officer before being recalled to Napoli. Brancaccio participated on the March of Rome on the side of the Italian Fascist Party.

Brancaccio was then assigned to a division of Askari Riflemen during the Italo-Abyssinian War. He was awarded with many medals for heroism in combat, including the Commemorative Medal of the Colonial Battalion of the Askari. He was given a promotion to the rank of Brigadier-General.

Shortly after this promotion, Brancaccio would remain in Addis Ababa at the Colonial War Institute of East Africa.

During the outbreak of the 2nd World War, Brancaccio would be wounded in combat by an artillery piece, suffering shrapnel wounds in his back before returning to Naples. He would be given another promotion to the rank of Major-General.

After the fall of Italian East Africa, Brancaccio would be assigned to the Governorate of Montenegro and would head up a battalion of the XVII Corps in Podgorica.

With the Allied Invasion of Sicily, Brancaccio would be re-assigned with his corps to the defense of Sicily. As the allies moved further up the peninsula, the XVII Corps would be disarmed after the Armistice of Cassibile. Brancaccio did not accept the armistice, feigning retirement, before he would flee further north into the newly recreated Italian Social Republic. As the war dragged on, Brancaccio would be assigned to various command positions in the National Republican Army.

After the death of Benito Mussolini, Brancaccio would surrender to the Italian partisans. With the war concluded, Brancaccio was pardoned by King Umberto II days before the end of the Italian monarchy. He would return to Naples before joining Giorgio Almirante's Neo-Fascist Movement.

Notes

References

1888 births
1971 deaths
Italian Army officers
Italian Social Movement politicians
Italian military personnel of World War II